For elections in the European Union, South-East France is a European Parliament constituency. It consists of the regions of Corsica, Provence-Alpes-Côte d'Azur and the former region Rhône-Alpes (now part of region Auvergne-Rhône-Alpes).

Results
Brackets indicate the number of votes per seat won.

2009

2004

References

External links
 European Election News by European Election Law Association (Eurela)
French Interior Ministry results website (fr)

Former European Parliament constituencies in France
Politics of Auvergne-Rhône-Alpes
Politics of Provence-Alpes-Côte d'Azur
Politics of Corsica